Yana van der Meulen Rodgers is a professor in the Department of Labor Studies and Employment Relations in the School of Management and Labor Relations at Rutgers University,.  She also serves as Faculty Director of the Center for Women and Work at Rutgers.   

Rodgers works regularly as a consultant for the Asian Development Bank, the World Bank, and the United Nations.  She has authored numerous journal articles in economics and has written two books.  She was the president of the International Association for Feminist Economics (IAFFE) from 2013 to 2014.

Rodgers serves as an associate editor of the journals Feminist Economics and World Development .

Education 
Rodgers earned her BA in economics in 1987 from Cornell University, and her MA and PhD in economics from Harvard University in 1989 and 1993.

Research 
The main areas of research that she covers are: feminist economics, labor studies, health economics, and development economics.

Publications

Books

Chapters in books

Journal articles

Papers 
  Pdf paper.
  Pdf paper.
  Pdf paper.
  Pdf paper. (Published November 1999)
  Pdf paper.
  Pdf paper.
  Pdf paper.

See also 
 Feminist economics
 List of feminist economists

References 

1966 births
Cornell University alumni
Feminist economists
Dutch economists
Dutch women economists
Harvard University alumni
Living people
Rutgers University faculty
Presidents of the International Association for Feminist Economics